The Roewe E50 is an all-electric car that is manufactured by the Chinese manufacturer Roewe.

Overview
The E50 was originally unveiled as the E1 concept car at the 2012 Beijing International Automotive Exhibition. In November 2012, SAIC Motor introduced the production version of the Roewe E50, a four seater supermini sized hatchback for the market in China.

The E50 uses several lightweight materials from Evonik to reduce energy consumption and to achieve lower emissions.

In 2012, the electric car pricing started at  before available government incentives, and SAIC's goal was to sell 1,000 units within the first year in the market. Retail deliveries began in Shanghai in January 2013.

As of 2013, these incentives were thought to make the E50 competitive with the price of an economy family car.

MG Dynamo EV

The E50 was provided the basis of MG Dynamo EV, a concept car shown in the United Kingdom during spring 2014. The Dynamo uses a 71bhp electric motor developing 155Nm of torque, and has a range of 50 miles on a single charge.

References

External links

Production electric cars
2010s cars
E50
Cars introduced in 2012
Cars of China